Beijing Miyun Economic Development Area is a provincial-level economic development zone in Miyun District, Beijing, China. As of 2020, its population was 2,899.

See also 
 List of township-level divisions of Beijing

References

Miyun District
Special Economic Zones of China
Township-level divisions of Beijing